Joseph M. Mendiola was a member of the Senate of the Commonwealth of the Northern Mariana Islands (CNMI). He represented the second senatorial district of Tinian & Aguiguan and was a member of the CNMI Covenant Party.

As Senate President of the 15th CNMI Legislature (2006–2008), Senator Mendiola co-founded the Outlying Areas Senate Presidents Caucus with his counterparts from Guam, Hawaii, Alaska, and Puerto Rico in December 2007.

External links
Senator Joseph M. Mendiola (President), 15th CNMI Legislature
Saipan Tribune's report on the first day of the 15th Senate

Living people
Covenant Party (Northern Mariana Islands) politicians
Year of birth missing (living people)